Realizing Goals (RM) is a political party in Panama. It was recognized by the Electoral Tribunal of Panama on March 24, 2021. The party is led by the former president of Panama, Ricardo Martinelli. As of February 2023, the party had 234,634 members.

History 
Realizing Goals was founded by Ricardo Martinelli after splitting from the Democratic Change party. After Martinelli was arrested for illegal wiretapping during his presidency on June 12, 2017, Rómulo Roux took over as a leader of the Democratic Change party. After Martinelli was acquitted of the charges in August 2019, he demanded the renewal of CD's board of directors, but was rejected. In February 2020, a faction led by Martinelli decided to renounce CD and create the Realizing Goals party.

Initially, the new party was proposed as the "Martinelist Party". However, the electoral regulations rejected it, as it is forbidden to name a party using the name of a living person. As an alternative, several names were chosen using the initials of the former president Martinelli (RM), with Realizing Goals (Realizando Metas) being the most accepted. After holding a constitutive convention and collecting the necessary signatures, the electoral authorities officially recognized the party on March 24, 2021.

For the 2024 general election, the party nominated Martinelli as a presidential candidate, seeking his second presidential term.

References 

Political parties established in 2021
Political parties in Panama